Velaiilla Pattadhari 2 is a 2017 Indian Tamil-language comedy drama film directed by Soundarya Rajnikanth. It is a sequel to the 2014 film Velaiilla Pattadhari and has Dhanush, Amala Paul, Vivek, Hrishikesh, Saranya Ponvannan, and Samuthirakani reprising their roles, while Kajol plays an antagonistic role, marking her return to Tamil cinema after 20 years, with her last film being Minsara Kanavu (1997). This film was primarily shot in Tamil, and it was partially reshot in Telugu, under the title of VIP 2, in which certain scenes of Dhanush were additionally filmed. Dhanush, besides acting, also co-produced with N. Ramasamy, and wrote the story and dialogues for the film. Its music was composed by Sean Roldan. 

VIP 2 was released worldwide on 11 August 2017 to mixed reviews.

Plot 

Two years later, Raghuvaran wins the Civil Engineer of the Year 2016 Award and is an executive member of his company now, along with a parking spot. His wife Dr. Shalini becomes an authoritative, nagging wife who controls him. She has resigned from her job to take care of the household, after marriage. Raghuvaran is also dismissive about his wife getting another job. Raghuvaran efficiently completes construction projects assigned to him, with the help of about 200 unemployed young civil, mechanical and electrical engineers, who are his friends. Vasundhara, a chairman of a big construction company in South India, Vasundhara Constructions, witness the announcement of Raghuvaran's victory at the Engineer of the Year 2016 Awards and finds out about him. She makes Raghuvaran a job offer, but he humbly refuses.

Later, Raghuvaran's project team and Vasundhara's top team are invited at the same time to exhibit their models for a proposed private medical college and hospital building to a very rich and native trader. Vasundhara exhibits her project with heavy pride and ego, while Raghuvaran explains his project in a simple manner. The trader gives the project to Anitha Constructions. Raghuvaran provides some polite advice to Vasundhara outside the building. This offends her, and she begins to go after him, placing one obstacle after another. First, she uses her influence in the state cabinet to force the trader to give the project back to her. She then makes counter-bids to all of Anitha Construction's projects at a lower price, causing the company to lose their own projects. Raghuvaran learns of this and quits his own job just to save his first company.

He is approached by the son of a Delhi-based construction mogul, with the idea of starting a new construction company with 50-50 shares. Raghuvaran agrees by putting his house under the mortgage of five million Rs and starts "VIP" Constructions with the 200 unemployed engineers as the company's employees. They don't get to start projects for a month. Due to a word of mouth, they get an offer from Prakash, a greedy businessman who wants to build a theme park in a marshy land. Raghuvaran's gang gets excited, but the soil tests prove them wrong. So, they decline the project. Prakash bribes an executive member of Vasundhara Constructions and makes her start on the same project. Raghuvaran's team starts a protest, and a countrywide uproar causes the project to be stopped by the government. Prakash is caught up between various lawsuits filed across the country. This causes a bad name and a loss of projects to Vasundhara Constructions. To eliminate Raghuvaran, she targets his company. She anonymously buys the 50% shares held by Raghuvaran, when it is legally up for sale to create funds. Raghuvaran is fired from VIP Constructions by Vasundhara, causing the employees to quit their own jobs immediately.

That night, Prakash sends goons to kill Raghuvaran, but Raghuvaran beats them all up. He thinks that Vasundhara had sent them and goes to her office room in her company's main headquarters building. Vasundhara is alone in the building, as she is currently thinking about the loyalty of all the employees of VIP Constructions towards Raghuvaran. Raghuvaran initially berates, then advises Vasundhara, and starts to leave. Unfortunately, the office is flooded due to heavy downpour, and they are trapped in their floor. They then cooperate to find biscuits and wine in the top floor.

Cast 

 Dhanush as Raghuvaran, Anitha Constructions civil engineer
 Kajol as Vasundhara Parameshwar, Vasundhara Constructions chairman (Voice dubbed by Deepa Venkat)
 Amala Paul as Dr. Shalini Raghuvaran, Raghuvaran's wife (Voice dubbed by Savitha Reddy)
 Vivek as Azhagusundaram, Raghuvaran's partner
 Hrishikesh as Karthik, Raghuvaran's brother
 Samuthirakani as Raghuvaran's father
 Saranya Ponvannan as Bhuvana, Raghuvaran's mother
 Meera Krishnan as Shalini's mother
 Saravana Subbiah as Prakash, a greedy businessman
 Cell Murugan as Manikkam, Raghuvaran's assistant
 Balaji Mohan as Balaji
 G. M. Kumar as Chettiyar
 Florent Pereira as Ponnuangam
 M. J. Shriram as Ramkumar, Anitha's father
 S. Kathiresan as Shalini's father
 Lokesh as Vasundhara's manager
 Kimu Gopal as Bank Manager 
 Kishore Rajkumar as Raghuvaran's friend
 Mirchi Vijay as Raghuvaran's friend
 Put Chutney Rajmohan as Prakash's lawyer
 Sethupathi Jayaychandran as M. S. Arivazhagan
 Andrews as Newsreader
 Som Shekar as Vasundhara's escort
 Priyadarshini Rajkumar as Client
 Ritu Varma as Anitha (cameo appearance)
 Raiza Wilson as Vasundhara's PA (cameo appearance)
 Sijoy Varghese as Vasundhara's father (photo credit)

Production

Development 
After their 2014 film, Velaiilla Pattadhari, Velraj and Dhanush worked on the production of Thangamagan (2015), which was initially widely reported to be a sequel to their previous film. During the production stages of the film, Dhanush denied that this was the case and confirmed it was a different script. Later, in mid-2016, Dhanush's sister-in-law, Soundarya Rajinikanth agreed to terms with producer N. Ramasamy and Hema Rukmai to make a romantic drama film titled Nilavukku Enmel Ennadi Kobam and cast Dhanush in the lead role. Despite negotiations with actresses including Sonam Kapoor, Kajal Aggarwal and Manjima Mohan, the project failed to materialise, and in a sudden turn of events, Dhanush revealed that he would instead collaborate with Soundarya for a sequel to his earlier film Velaiilla Pattadhari. The film was revealed to be co-produced by N. Ramasamy, while the latter would also write the script of the film. Sean Roldon was signed to replace Anirudh as the film's composer, while the theme music composed by Anirudh was retained in the new project. During the launch event of the film, it was announced that Sameer Thahir would work as the cinematographer, while Prasanna GK would be the editor. The film was originally shot in Tamil while certain scenes of Dhanush were additionally filmed in Telugu. The film was also subsequently dubbed and released into Hindi as VIP 2 - Lalkar with Kajol dubbing for herself.

Casting 
Casting for the film began in late 2016, with several members of the original cast, including Amala Paul, Samuthirakani, Vivek and Hrishikesh retained for the sequel. Saranya, whose character died in the first film, was also selected to portray a role. Hindi film actress Kajol was also selected to play a pivotal role in the film, which marks her comeback in Tamil cinema after nearly 20 years.

Filming 
Production on the film began on 15 December 2016, with actor Rajinikanth in attendance at the launch event in his family's Poes Garden home in Chennai. The team filmed a promo song in Mumbai, choreographed by Bosco and Caesar. Filming ended in May 2017.

Release 

The film was originally planned to release on 28 July 2017, coinciding with Dhanush's birthday, but was postponed to 11 August 2017. The Hindi version of this film was released on 18 August 2017 and Telugu version was released on 25 August 2017.

Reception 
The film received mixed reviews from critics and audience. Baradwaj Rangan of Film Companion wrote "But then, this is not just a lazy rehash like the Singam films...there’s a sensibility here...VIP 2 is by no means a great film, but given the constraints of a "mass" movie, especially a sequel, it left me pleasantly surprised.".

Regarding the Telugu version, a critic from The Hindu called the film a "wasted opportunity" and criticized the film's inaccurate use of license plates and the references to film stars.

Box office 

Soundtrack 

The soundtrack was composed by Sean Roldan. The tracklist featuring five tracks was released on 1 July 2017 at Mumbai. Some themes that were highlights of the characters and title were retained from the first film, composed by Anirudh Ravichander.
Track list

References

External links
 

2010s Tamil-language films
2017 films
Indian sequel films
2017 masala films
Films scored by Sean Roldan
Films scored by Anirudh Ravichander
2010s action comedy-drama films
Indian action comedy-drama films
Indian multilingual films
2017 multilingual films